Waskia (Vaskia, Woskia) is a Papuan language of Papua New Guinea. It is spoken on half of Karkar Island, and a small part of the shore on the mainland, by 20,000 people; language use is vigorous. The Waskia share their island with speakers of Takia, an Oceanic language which has been restructured under the influence of Waskia, which is the inter-community language. Waskia has been documented extensively by Malcolm Ross and is being further researched by Andrew Pick.

Waskia is spoken in Tokain, a village in Malas ward, Sumgilbar Rural LLG on the coast of mainland New Guinea, and on Karkar Island, with the island and mainland varieties being lexically divergent from each other.

Comparisons
Below are some Waskia lexical forms compared with Amako and Proto-Northern Adelbert.

References

Further reading

Kowan languages
Languages of Madang Province